Oksalur Township (ئوقسالۇر يېزىسى / Wuheshalu) is a township of Ulugqat County (Wuqia) in Kizilsu Kyrgyz Autonomous Prefecture, Xinjiang Uygur Autonomous Region, China. Located in the southwest of the county, the township covers an area of 1,745.5 square kilometers with a population of 1,031 (as of 2017). It has 2 villages under its jurisdiction. Its seat is at Qat Village.

Oksalur Township is located 35 kilometers west of the county seat Wuqia Town. It is adjacent to Kiziloy Township in the east, Boritokay Township in the south and Ulugqat Township in the northwest, and borders with the Kyrgyz Republic in the west with a boundary line of 7 kilometers. There are 2 mountain passes and a river connecting with Kyrgyzstan.

Name
The word Oksalur (ئوقسالۇر) comes from the Kyrgyz language, which means 'bullets in the chamber (of a gun)' or 'bullet in the bore (of a gun)'- Ok (ئوق), transliterated into Chinese characters as Wuhe (吾合) means 'bullet'. According to local tradition, there were numerous battles in this place, and the commanders ordered the locals' guns to be loaded with bullets. The name Oksalur is transliterated into Chinese characters as Wuheshalu. In Qing Dynasty maps of Shufu County, Oksalur is transliterated into Chinese characters as Wohusulu.

History

Oksalur was part of the 2nd district of Wuqia County in 1950. Oksalur Commune  was formed in 1958. In 1968 during the Cultural Revolution, the commune was renamed Weidong Commune . The original name was restored in 1980, and the commune was reorganized as a township in 1984.

In early 2017, a security checkpoint was set up outside the door of the Oksalur Township border guard office.

Geography
There is a scrubland along the Kezi River including many sea buckthorn.

Settlements
The township has 2 administrative villages and 3  unincorporated villages under its jurisdiction.
 Qat Village (Qiati) meaning 'fork in the road' or 'junction'
 Oksalur Village (ئوقسالۇر كەنت / Wuheshalu)
 Maraltokay

Demographics

, the population of Kiziloy was 98% Kyrgyz.

Economy
The economy of Oksalur is based on agriculture and animal husbandry.

Transportation
Public roads to the north connect Oksalur to the road between Ulugqat Township and Artux.

References 

Township-level divisions of Wuqia County